Robert Walter Kustra (born March 21, 1943) is an American politician and academic administrator who served as the Lieutenant Governor of Illinois from 1991 to 1998 and the President of Boise State University from 2003 to 2018.

Education 
Kustra received his Bachelor of Arts in political science from Benedictine College in Atchison, Kansas, his master's degree in Public Administration from Southern Illinois University Carbondale, and his PhD in political science from the University of Illinois Urbana-Champaign.

Career

Politics 
Kustra served in both houses of the Illinois General Assembly. He served in the House of Representatives, representing the 4th district, from January 14, 1981, to January 12, 1983, when he began representing the 28th district in the Senate, which he did until he resigned to become the Lieutenant Governor in 1991. While in the Senate, he served as Assistant Minority Leader. He was voted Best Freshman Legislator during his first year in each house.

He was elected 43rd Lieutenant Governor of Illinois as Jim Edgar's running-mate, and served from January 14, 1991, to July 1, 1998, when he resigned to become president of Eastern Kentucky University.

He sought the Republican nomination for United States Senate in 1996 to succeed Paul Simon but was defeated in the primary by Illinois Representative Al Salvi.

The defeat to Al Salvi was considered a major political upset. Kustra before the primary was considered a heavy favorite to defeat Salvi, a relatively unknown conservative state representative, and Chicago area attorney.

Academics 
Kustra served as a member of the faculty at University of Illinois Springfield, Loyola University of Chicago, the University of Illinois Chicago, and Northwestern University. Kustra served as president of Eastern Kentucky University from 1998 until 2001. From 2003 to 2018, he was president of Boise State University and is a member of the board of the Western Interstate Commission for Higher Education. He also hosted the radio show Reader's Corner on Boise State Public Radio.

He has also served in the following university organizations:

 Midwestern Higher Education Commission (president)
 Illinois Board of Higher Education (chairman)
 NCAA Division I (executive committee and board of directors)
 Presidential Task Force on the Future of Intercollegiate Athletics

While Boise State University saw enormous growth during Kustra's tenure there, his leadership was not without criticism. Congressman Raúl Labrador in August, 2017 suggested that it might be time for Kustra to leave Boise State University. Kustra and Labrador have been critical of each other.

Kustra retired from his position of President of Boise State in the summer of 2018, having announced his pending retirement in November 2017.

References

External links 
 1997–1998 Illinois Blue Book: Lt. Governor biography page 23
 1981–1982 Illinois Blue Book: Illinois General Assembly District 4 representative biography page 76
 1983–1984 Illinois Blue Book: Illinois General Assembly District 28 senate biography page 87

1943 births
Living people
Lieutenant Governors of Illinois
Republican Party members of the Illinois House of Representatives
Republican Party Illinois state senators
Presidents of Eastern Kentucky University
People from Park Ridge, Illinois
Politicians from St. Louis
Benedictine College alumni
Southern Illinois University Carbondale alumni
University of Illinois Urbana-Champaign alumni